Club Balonmano Sagunto was a Spanish women's handball club from Sagunto founded in 1978 which in July, 2012 moved to Valencia and joint CE Handbol Marítim to play in División de Honor as Valencia Aicequip.

History
Mar Valencia was founded in 1963 as Sección Femenina's women's handball team in Valencia (Medina Valencia) before becoming an independent club in 1978 as Íber Valencia. In 1993 it again changed its official name, taking the aforementioned one. It was also known as El Osito L'Eliana and Milar L'Eliana in subsequent years for sponsorship reasons, having moved to L'Eliana.

Íber/Mar dominated the Spanish scene through the 1980s and 1990s, winning a record 20 national leagues in a row between 1979 and 1998 and 19 national cups between 1981 and 2000. In 1997 it became the first Spanish team to win the Champions League by beating Viborg HK in the final. The team also reached the Champions' final the following year, but lost it to Hypo Niederösterreich

The following years marked the ending of the club's national hegemony but it still enjoyed success in national and internacional grounds. In 2000 Mar won the Cup Winners' Cup over Kuban Krasnodar, and in 2003 it reached its third Champions League final, lost to Krim Ljubljana.

In 2004 the club moved from L'Eliana to Sagunto and changed its name to Balonmano Sagunto, a.k.a. Astroc Sagunto (2004–07) and Parc Sagunto (2007–11) after its sponsors. In 2005 it won its final league to date and in 2006 it reached the Champions League's semifinals. While Sagunto still ranked among Division de Honor top three teams, its only major success in subsequent years was winning the 2008 Spanish Cup (Copa de la Reina)

Due to the lack of sponsorship, in July 2012 it moved back to Valencia to join emerging Valencian club CE Handbol Marítim, which became its successor.<ref>[http://www.marca.com/2012/07/18/balonmano/1342624463.html Mar Valencia transfers its rights to CEH Marítim.] Marca, 18/07/12</ref>

Names
1963–1978: Club Medina de Valencia
1978–1992: CB Íber
1992–1994: CB Mar Valencia
1994–1997: Mar El Osito L'Eliana (moved to L'Eliana)
1997–1998: CB Milar
1998–2003: Mar El Osito L'Eliana
2003–2004: Alucine Alser Sagunto (moved to Sagunto)
2004–2007: Astroc Sagunto
2007–2010: Parc Sagunt
2010–2012: Mar Sagunto

TrophiesDivisión de Honor Femenina (27)1968, 1969, 1974, 1979 — 1998, 2000 — 2002, 2005Copa de la Reina (20)1981 — 1989, 1991 — 2000, 2008Supercopa de España (4)1999–00, 2001–02, 2002–03, 2005–06Copa ABF (2)2008, 2009Champions League (1)1997Cup Winners' Cup (1)2000Champions Trophy (1)'''
1997

Notable players 

  Macarena Aguilar
  Bárbara Arenhart
  Alexandrina Barbosa
  Nuria Benzal
  Svetlana Bogdanova
  Stéphanie Cano
  Elisabet Chávez
  Verónica Cuadrado
  Beatriz Fernández
  Begoña Fernández
   Ausra Fridrikas
  Marta Mangué
  Tatjana Medved
   Natalya Morskova
  Silvia Navarro
  Noelia Oncina
  Iva Perica
  Elisabeth Pinedo
  Bojana Radulovics
  Fernanda da Silva
  Darly de Paula

References

Sports teams in the Valencian Community
Spanish handball clubs
Handball clubs established in 1963
Handball clubs established in 1978
Sports clubs disestablished in 2012
1978 establishments in Spain
2012 disestablishments in Spain
Defunct handball clubs
Sagunto